Ahmedabad Racquet Academy Football Club (commonly known as ARA FC Gujarat) is an Indian professional football club based in Ahmedabad, Gujarat. They have competed in the I-League 2nd Division.  ARA FC is the first professional team from Gujarat to compete in the nationwide league. The club also competes in Gujarat SFA Club Championship.

Their reserve and youth teams play in both Hero Sub-Junior League and Hero Elite League, while women team is member of Indian Women's League.

History

Academy and early years
Ahmedabad Racquet Academy (ARA) started its journey as a professional multi-sports academy in Ahmedabad, Gujarat, which mainly consists of racquet sports and has been running since 2011 and began participating in Ahmedabad Junior league. The football club was among the newest projects established by the academy in recent times as an initiative by owner Vikram Patel.

Formation of club
The existing academy owned by Patel emerged as ARA FC in 2016 to ensure development of football in the Indian state of Gujarat. On 19 July 2018, their academy were accredited and given two stars based on eligibility criteria, which allowed them to play in Youth League U18. ARA as a club became affiliated with Gujarat State Football Association (GSFA) in 2017, and began competing in the ADFA Premier Division League.

2018–present

On 20 November 2018, AIFF nominated ARA for proposed inclusion in the 2018–19 2nd Division League. On 7 December, it was announced that ARA FC would be one of nine clubs to play that season. Thus the Ahmedabad-based club became the only team from the state competing in a domestic tier league.

In their maiden I-League 2nd Division in the 2018–19 season, ARA finished on fourth place in Group A with 11 points in 8 matches as Lonestar Kashmir progressed to the final round.

They were nominated for participating in the 2021 I-League Qualifiers, since emerging victorious in Gandhinagar Premier League. They began their journey with a 1–1 draw against Corbett FC on 5 October at the Bangalore Football Stadium but did not advanced to the final round. In February–March 2023, the club participated in Stafford Challenge Cup in Bangalore.

Home stadium

ARA FC plays its home matches at the EKA Arena, which has a capacity of 20,000 spectators. The stadium is located in Kankaria Lake, Ahmedabad, and has additional 10,000 temporary seats on the pitch area.

Kit manufacturers and shirt sponsors

Current squad

Current technical staff

Honours

League
Gujarat SFA Club Championship
Champions (1): 2022
ADFA Ahmedabad District League 2nd Division
Champions (1): 2017
ADFA Ahmedabad District League 1st Division
Champions (2): 2018, 2021–22
Gandhinagar Premier League
Champions (1): 2020–21

Cup
Heritage Cup Jaipur
Champions (1): 2020

Records

Key
Tms. = Number of teams
Pos. = Position in league
Attendance/G = Average league attendance

Managerial record
updated on 25 October 2020

Notable players
For current and former notable ARA FC players with a Wikipedia article, see: ARA FC players.

Other departments

Women's team
ARA FC has its women's football team that competes in the Indian Women's League, the highest division of Indian women's football. Before the kick-off of 2021–22 Indian Women's League season, four teams including ARA Women from four states played each other once in April 2022, in the qualifying round at the Ambedkar Stadium in New Delhi and they qualified for the final round after topping the group.

Honours
Gujarat State Women's League
Champions (1): 2021–22
Third place (1): 2022–23

Youth men's
Youth men's team of ARA competes in the Ahmedabad Elite Youth Cup Ahmedabad. Club's U17 team participated in "regional group stages" of 2022–23 U-17 Youth Cup.

See also
 List of football clubs in India

References

External links
 ARA Football Club at the-aiff.com
Team info at spotik.in
Team info at Global Sports Archive
ARA FC archives at ANI News

 
Football clubs in Gujarat
I-League 2nd Division clubs
Sports clubs established in 2016
2016 establishments in Gujarat
Sport in Ahmedabad